The Generic Gangster Chase Game is a 1981 board game published by Generic Games.

Gameplay
The Generic Gangster Chase Game is a game in which the mob hitman Big Jim pursues top reporter Ace Wilson.

Reception
W. G. Armintrout reviewed The Generic Gangster Chase Game in The Space Gamer No. 45. Armintrout commented that "The Generic Gangster Chase Game is a pleasant way to spend half an hour. I would not suggest it as a substitute for Imperium, but it is acceptable for beer-and-pretzels play."

References

Board games introduced in 1981